Dakshin Kamrup Girls' College is a general degree college at Mirza in Kamrup district of Assam. The college is affiliated to Gauhati University.

Departments
  Assamese
  English
 Economics
 Education
 History
 Home Science
 Mass Communication & Journalism
 Philosophy

Accreditation
In 2016 the college has been awarded 'B' grade by the National Assessment and Accreditation Council.

References

Colleges affiliated to Gauhati University
Kamrup district
Educational institutions established in 1988
1988 establishments in Assam